Protagophleps is a genus of moths belonging to the family Tineidae. It contains only one species, Protagophleps masoala, which is found on Madagascar.

References

Tineidae
Monotypic moth genera
Moths of Madagascar
Moths of Africa
Tineidae genera
Taxa named by Pierre Viette